Hanste Khelte is a 1994 Indian Hindi-language film directed by Bharat Rangachary and produced by Firoz Nadiadwala. It stars Rahul Roy, Nandini Singh (who made her debut with this film), Asrani, Rakesh Bedi, Anant Mahadevan and Ishrat Ali. Amitabh Bachchan gives his voice as a God in this film. The film aired on Zee TV in 1994.

Cast
 Rahul Roy as Rahul Chopra
 Nandini Singh as Pooja Verma
 Asrani as Namah
 Lisa Ray as Rekha (Special appearance)
 Rakesh Bedi as Om
 Anant Mahadevan as Shivah
 Satyajeet as Amit
 Aparajita as Pooja's maidservant
 Ishrat Ali as Devil
 Dinesh Hingoo as Bhonsle

Soundtrack

References

External links

1990s Hindi-language films
1994 films
Films scored by Jatin–Lalit
Films directed by Bharat Rangachary